A. & M. Karagheusian, Inc. was a rug manufacturer headquartered at 295 Fifth Avenue in Manhattan. Manufacturing was located in Freehold Borough, New Jersey and operated for 60 years before closing in 1964. It employed 1,700 people at its peak operation in the 1930s. Bruce Springsteen wrote about the Karagheusian Rug Mill’s closing in his 1984 song "My Hometown".

History
Arshag Karagheusian (1872-1963) and Miran Karagheusian (1874-1948), were Armenians and fled Turkey in 1896 to go to England and then to the United States. The family had been in the rug trade in Turkey since 1818, and they began in the United States in 1897 as rug importers, and then expanded into manufacturing in 1903. By 1927 they had 15 broadlooms, weighing 15 tons each, and 196 single looms. They developed, and were the only manufacturers of "Gulistan Rug" carpets. They made the carpet for Radio City Music Hall in 1932 and for the United States Supreme Court building in 1933. They stopped manufacturing oriental carpets in 1953.

Miran Karagheusian
Miran Karagheusian (1874–1948) married Zabelle and had: Howard Karagheusian who died young, and a scholarship was set up in his name; and a daughter, Leila Karagheusian (c1910-1999). Miran Karagheusian died on October 7, 1948, at Lenox Hill Hospital in Manhattan, he lived in Oyster Bay, New York and he had attended Robert College in Turkey.

Arshag Karagheusian

Arshag Karagheusian (1872–1963) had the following children: Jean Karagheusian Hallaure (1898–2000) aka Alice Hallaure; Charles Karagheusian (1903–1977) who married Artemis Tavshanjian (1904–1990) on April 30, 1927, and Marguerite Karagheusian Agathon (husband Oshin Agathon) (1904–1986). Arshag served as the head of the Armenian General Benevolent Union from 1943 to 1952. Arshag died on September 24, 1963, in Larchmont, New York.

Renovation
In 2001, the mill reopened as a 202-unit affordable apartment complex, named The Continental at Freehold. The New Jersey Department of Community Affairs (DCA) and its affiliated New Jersey Housing and Mortgage Finance Agency (HMFA) were major financiers of the project. Community Affairs Commissioner Jane M. Kenny said: "Nearly forty years after the looms were packed up and hauled away, the rug mill is a working building once again."

Archive
The Monmouth County Historical Association at 70 Court Street in Freehold Borough, New Jersey, houses a collection of manuscripts, newsletters, newspaper clippings, photographs, negatives and other materials related to the A & M Karagheusian Rug Mill, which was located in Freehold, New Jersey.

Roselle Park factory
The company had a factory in Roselle Park, New Jersey, from May 19, 1923, to 1962.

References

External links
Monmouth County Historical Association: Coll. 51 A & M Karagheusian, Inc. Records, 1914-2001
NJ Department of Community Affairs: Karagheusian Rug Mill
About Gulistan: Current manufacturer website

1904 establishments in the United States
Armenian-American culture in New York City
Armenian-American history
Carpet manufacturing companies
Freehold Borough, New Jersey
Persian rugs and carpets
Turkic rugs and carpets
Textile companies of the United States